Heiki is an Estonian masculine given name, variant of Hendrik ("Henry")

People named Heiki include:
Heiki Arike (1965–2018), politician and major in the Estonian Defence League
Heiki Ernits (born 1953), caricaturist and film director
Heiki Hepner (born 1966), politician
Heiki Kranich (born 1961), politician
Heiki Loot (born 1971), state official 
Heiki Nabi (born 1985), wrestler
Heiki Raudla (born 1949), educator, cartoonist and politician
Heiki Sarapuu (born 1965), competitive runner
Heiki Sorge (born 1974), badminton player
Heiki Valk (born 1959), archaeologist
Heiki Vilep (born 1960), writer

References

Estonian masculine given names